David Ingram (April 24, 1948 – March 10, 2005) was a Hollywood, California based studio session musician, songwriter and arranger. As a keyboard player, Ingram was a member of the Marin County based group AnExchange, who toured Europe with The Platters and The Coasters, backed up Carlo Thomas, worked with record producer Bob Conti, and performed with the Las Vegas Enterprize in the Fredrick Apcar's production, The Sands Playmate Review.

Ingram was a founding member of the first Christian rock band Love Song with Chuck Girard in the early 1970s, and performed on the Elliot Mintz television show Headshop (1971).  He later became a well known blues  player and session musician in Los Angeles, California, playing as sideman for many acts, best known alongside blues guitarist Guitar Shorty for many years.

External links

History of AnExchange

1948 births
2005 deaths
American keyboardists
AnExchange members
Love Song (band) members
American blues musicians
20th-century American musicians